Leroy Bernard Shield (October 2, 1893 – January 9, 1962) was an American film score and radio composer. He is best known for the themes and incidental music he wrote for the classic Hal Roach comedy short films of the 1930s, including the Our Gang and Laurel and Hardy series.

Career
Shield was a native of Waseca, Minnesota. Around 1922, he became a staff musician for the Victor Talking Machine Company (which later became RCA Victor), where he composed and conducted on-air music, and provided piano accompaniment on hundreds of popular and USF (US domestic foreign language) Victor recordings. He also worked part-time for the Hal Roach film studio, composing countless background themes that became associated with such Roach comedy stars as Laurel and Hardy, Our Gang, ZaSu Pitts and Thelma Todd, and Charley Chase. "The Good Old Days", Shield's composition for the 1930 Our Gang short Teacher's Pet, became the series's theme song, "Let's Go" was the theme used for shorts by The Boy Friends, and his 1930 song "Beautiful Lady" was used as the theme song for the Pitts and Todd films.

On September 25, 1930, Shield recorded his only commercial recordings, "Sing Song Girl" (vocal by James Blackstone) and "Song Of The Big Trail" (vocal by Bud Jamison), issued as Victor 22548.

Later career and death
A series of miscommunications led to Shield's requests for scoring assignments from the Roach organization being repeatedly declined after 1936; the work went instead to Marvin Hatley. Shield continued to work for NBC in various musical capacities, including composition and conducting. He also wrote two tone poems, Gloucester and The Great Bell, and the classical Union Pacific Suite.

After touring with Toscanini during the early 1950s, Shield retired in 1955. He died on January 9, 1962, in Vero Beach, Florida.

Legacy
In 1992, the Dutch band The Beau Hunks transcribed and recorded Shield's music from the Hal Roach comedies. The recordings drew praise from cartoonist R. Crumb, who rendered a portrait of Shield for the CD cover, and led to a renewed appreciation of the composer's work.
In late 2016, producer and pianist Alessandro Simonetto published a CD, Leroy Shield: The Laurel & Hardy Piano Music (AEVEA/OnClassical AE16024) with music from the original manuscripts and publications, and some piano transcriptions of Shield's music.

References

Listen to
Leroy Shield: clips and concerts

External links
Leroy Shield, Composer
 LeRoy Shield recordings at the Discography of American Historical Recordings.
 

1893 births
1962 deaths
American film score composers
American male film score composers
Hal Roach Studios filmmakers
People from Waseca, Minnesota
20th-century American composers
Film producers from Minnesota
20th-century American male musicians